The Women's 100 metres (T12) at the 2014 Commonwealth Games as part of the athletics programme was held at Hampden Park on 28 July 2014. The event was open to Para-sport athletes competing in the T12 classification, with heavily impaired vision, but T11 athletes were also allowed to enter, though no points system was used for parity. T12 and T11 athletes require running guides. The guides of those athletes that finished in the top three also received medals.

Results

First round
The first round consisted of three heats, with qualification to the finals for the first athlete in each heat and the fastest loser over the three heats.

Heat 1

Heat 2

Heat 3

Final

References

Women's 100 metres (T12)
2014 (T12)
2014 in women's athletics